Velykyi Burluk is an urban-type settlement in Ukraine, in Kupiansk Raion of Kharkiv Oblast. It hosts the administration of Velykyi Burluk rural hromada, one of the hromadas of Ukraine.  Population:  The settlement was controlled by the Russian military from February 24, 2022 to September 10, 2022.

History 

Founded as the village of Shevelivka in 1656, later it was renamed Velykyi Burluk. It was a village in Volchansk uyezd of the Kharkov Governorate.

A local newspaper has been published here since August 1931.

During World War II, it was under German occupation from June 1942 to February 1943.

It has been an urban-type settlement since 1963. In January 1989 the population was 5,224 people. In January 2013 the population was 4,053 people.

Until 18 July 2020, Velykyi Burluk was the administrative center of Velykyi Burluk Raion. The raion was abolished in July 2020 as part of the administrative reform of Ukraine, which reduced the number of raions of Kharkiv Oblast to seven. The area of Velykyi Burluk Raion was merged into Kupiansk Raion.

During the 2022 Russian invasion of Ukraine, the town was occupied by the Russian military in March 2022.  In July 2022, the pro-Russian leader of the area was reportedly killed by a car bomb by Ukrainian partisans.

On 11 September 2022, the town was liberated by Ukrainian forces.

Climate

References

Urban-type settlements in Kupiansk Raion
Volchansky Uyezd
Populated places established in 1656